Trud Stadium is a sports venue in Arkhangelsk. It is the home arena of bandy club Vodnik and has hosted the Bandy World Championship twice.

External links
 The stadium at rusbandy.ru

References

Bandy venues in Russia
Sport in Arkhangelsk
Bandy World Championships stadiums